Lido di Classe is a seaside resort on the Romagna Riviera  and a frazione of the comune of Ravenna located north of Lido di Savio. It is bounded to the south by the mouth of the river Savio and to the north by the coastal area of Pineta di Classe and the nature reserve at the mouth of the river Bevano.

The name Lido di Classe derives from the town of Classe, near Ravenna, the site of an important Roman port.

References

External links
Lido di Classe 

Frazioni of the Province of Ravenna